Ichthyology & Herpetology (formerly Copeia) is a quarterly peer-reviewed scientific journal covering research in ichthyology and herpetology that was originally named after Edward Drinker Cope, a prominent American researcher in these fields. It is the official journal of the American Society of Ichthyologists and Herpetologists. According to the Journal Citation Reports, Copeia has a 2021 impact factor of 1.857, ranking it 65th out of 176 journals in the category "Zoology".

History 
On December 27, 1913, John Treadwell Nichols published the first issue of Copeia. This issue consisted of a single piece of paper folded to form four pages of information with five articles. The cover of the pamphlet bore the inscription: "Published by the contributors to advance the science of coldblooded vertebrates."  In 2020, the American Society of Ichthyologists and Herpetologists voted to rename the journal, Ichthyology & Herpetology.

Name change 
The journal was named after Edward Drinker Cope, a renowned 19th century herpetologist, naturalist, and paleontologist, who identified thousands of vertebrate species. In 2020, members of the Society raised the issue that the name of the journal be changed because Edward Drinker Cope held views on race and women that are undeniably offensive. The editor of the journal, W. Leo Smith, formally recommended the change of the journal's name on 29 June 2020 to the Society's Board of Governors. The American Society of Ichthyologists and Herpetologists' Executive Committee and Board of Governors voted to change the name of the journal on 2 July 2020. The journal was renamed Ichthyology & Herpetology in early 2021. On 19 March 2021, the first three articles of Ichthyology & Herpetology were published online. These three articles covered the history, context, and reasons for the name change, including an introduction from the journal's editor, an interview with the individuals voicing concerns about the name of the journal, and an essay (The Exact and Very Strange Truth) by the author, John Nichols, who is a grandson of the journal's founder, John Treadwell Nichols.

References

External links
 

Ichthyology journals
Herpetology journals
Publications established in 1913
Quarterly journals
English-language journals
1913 establishments in the United States